William H. Rexter  (1850 – June 23, 1898) was an American professional baseball player who played outfield for the 1875 Brooklyn Atlantics.

External links

"William Rexter Found" at SABR.org

1850 births
Date of birth missing
1898 deaths
Major League Baseball outfielders
Brooklyn Atlantics players
19th-century baseball players
Baseball players from New York (state)